Three Bays Protected Area (Aire Protégée de Ressources Naturelles Gérées des Trois Baies), also known as Three Bays National Park, is a protected area in northeastern Haiti. It protects coral reefs, seagrass beds, mangrove forests, and dry forests.

Geography
It is the second largest declared protected area in Haiti after the Port Salut/Aquin Protected Area (Aire Protégée de Ressources Naturelles Gérées de Port Salut/Aquin).

The north–south boundary extends from the   territorial sea limit inland to the 10-m topographic contour line. The western boundary is near Cap-Haïtien, Haiti's second largest city and capital of the Nord (Haitian department), served by Hugo Chávez International Airport and the Port international du Cap-Haïtien. The eastern boundary includes Fort Liberté, the capital of the Nord-Est (department), which is one of the oldest cities in the country and where Haiti's independence was proclaimed. The protected area is also directly adjacent to the 'Parque Nacional Manglares de Estero Balsa'  in the Dominican Republic, near the city of 'San Fernando de Monte Cristi', as well as national parks 'Parque Nacional Submarino de Monte Cristi', Parque Nacional el Morro'. marine refuge 'Cayos Sietes Hermanos' and wildlife refuge 'Laguna Saladilla'.

Ecology
The area contains some of the most extensive and healthiest fringing and barrier coral reefs, seagrass beds, and mangrove forests in the country, which provide critical coastal protection and ecosystem services for its seaside communities. The area is biologically productive but extremely overfished by many regional communities. The adjoining coastal plains are known for their diverse aquatic and brackish water habitats and dry tropical forests.

History
The region is also of historical importance having witnessed centuries of human history dating from pre-Columbian times and indigenous Taino occupations, to the arrival of Christopher Columbus and the sequence of world-altering events through Spanish and French colonization and the Haitian Revolution.

Conservation
This IUCN Category IV — Habitat/Species Management Area was created by Presidential Decree on March 21 (2014) to protect its unique marine complex of fringing and barrier coral reefs, seagrass beds, mangrove forests, and adjacent deep ocean and coastal plain. It is the first protected area in the country to be co-managed between the Agence Nationale des Aires Protégées (ANAP) of the Ministry of the Environment and the non-governmental/non-profit organization Fondation pour la Protection de la Biodiversité Marine (FoProBiM).

References

External links 
 Henwood W.D., Aucoin, S., and Turner M. (2017) The Protected Area of Managed Natural Resources of the Three Bays. Management Plan 2017–2027. Fondation pour la Protection de la Biodiversité Marine (FoProBiM), The Nature Conservancy (TNC) and The National Agency of Protected Areas (ANAP), Haiti. 155 p.

National parks of Haiti
Marine protected areas